Mahbub Anam (March 28, 1931 – July 9, 2001) was a Bangladeshi journalist and writer. He was the editor of The Bangladesh Times.

Early life
Anam's father Abul Mansur Ahmed was a satirist and politician of Bengal. His younger brother Mahfuz Anam is the editor of The Daily Star. Anam was actively involved in politics from his student life. He was the general secretary of Salimullah Muslim Hall of Dhaka University in 1954-55 and was appointed acting publications secretary of the Jukta Front on behalf of the Awami League in 1954.

Career
Anam also served as the general manager of Jamuna Oil Company and the director of Bangladesh Petroleum Corporation.

Anam served as the president of the Nattyamancho Bangladesh and Bangladesh Sahitya Sangskriti Kendro and was involved with Bangladesh Film Censor Board and Bangladesh Public Library Special Committee.

He was elected to parliament from Mymensingh-7 as a Bangladesh Nationalist Party candidate in 15 February 1996 Bangladeshi general election.

Works
Anam wrote Amra Bangladeshi Amra Bangalee and Itihasher Shikriti Bonam Bikriti.

Awards
 Bhasha Andoloner Bir Sainik Padak by the then president Ziaur Rahman
 Matribhasha Padak by Tamaddun Majlish
 Independence Day Award
 Sher-e-Bangla Gold Medal
 Moulana Akram Khan Gold Medal
 Kaloddhani Padak 
 Tribhuj Gold Medal

References

Bangladeshi journalists
1931 births
2001 deaths
20th-century journalists
6th Jatiya Sangsad members
Bangladesh Nationalist Party politicians
20th-century Bengalis
People from Mymensingh District